In physics, Kaluza–Klein theory (KK theory) is a classical unified field theory of gravitation and electromagnetism built around the idea of a fifth dimension beyond the common 4D of space and time and considered an important precursor to string theory. Gunnar Nordström had an earlier, similar idea. But in that case, a fifth component was added to the electromagnetic vector potential, representing the Newtonian gravitational potential, and writing the Maxwell equations in five dimensions.

The five-dimensional (5D) theory developed in three steps. The original hypothesis came from Theodor Kaluza, who sent his results to Einstein in 1919 and published them in 1921. Kaluza presented a purely classical extension of general relativity to 5D, with a metric tensor of 15 components. Ten components are identified with the 4D spacetime metric, four components with the electromagnetic vector potential, and one component with an unidentified scalar field sometimes called the "radion" or the "dilaton". Correspondingly, the 5D Einstein equations yield the 4D Einstein field equations, the Maxwell equations for the electromagnetic field, and an equation for the scalar field. Kaluza also introduced the "cylinder condition" hypothesis, that no component of the five-dimensional metric depends on the fifth dimension. Without this restriction, terms are introduced that involve derivatives of the fields with respect to the fifth coordinate, and this extra degree of freedom makes the mathematics of the fully variable 5D relativity enormously complex. Standard 4D physics seems to manifest this "cylinder condition" and, along with it, simpler mathematics.

In 1926, Oskar Klein gave Kaluza's classical five-dimensional theory a quantum interpretation, to accord with the then-recent discoveries of Heisenberg and Schrödinger. Klein introduced the hypothesis that the fifth dimension was curled up and microscopic, to explain the cylinder condition. Klein also made a contribution to the classical theory by providing a properly normalized 5D metric. Work continued on the Kaluza field theory during the 1930s by Einstein and colleagues at Princeton.

In the 1940s the classical theory was completed, and the full field equations including the scalar field were obtained by three independent research groups: Thiry, working in France on his dissertation under Lichnerowicz; Jordan, Ludwig, and Müller in Germany, with critical input from Pauli and Fierz; and Scherrer working alone in Switzerland. Jordan's work led to the scalar–tensor theory of Brans–Dicke; Brans and Dicke were apparently unaware of Thiry or Scherrer. The full Kaluza equations under the cylinder condition are quite complex, and most English-language reviews, as well as the English translations of Thiry, contain some errors. The curvature tensors for the complete Kaluza equations were evaluated using tensor-algebra software in 2015, verifying results of Ferrari and Coquereaux & Esposito-Farese. The 5D covariant form of the energy–momentum source terms is treated by Williams.

Kaluza hypothesis 
In his 1921 article, Kaluza established all the elements of the classical five-dimensional theory: the metric, the field equations, the equations of motion, the stress–energy tensor, and the cylinder condition. With no free parameters, it merely extends general relativity to five dimensions. One starts by hypothesizing a form of the five-dimensional metric , where Latin indices span five dimensions. Let one also introduce the four-dimensional spacetime metric , where Greek indices span the usual four dimensions of space and time; a 4-vector  identified with the electromagnetic vector potential; and a scalar field . Then decompose the 5D metric so that the 4D metric is framed by the electromagnetic vector potential, with the scalar field at the fifth diagonal. This can be visualized as

One can write more precisely

where the index  indicates the fifth coordinate by convention, even though the first four coordinates are indexed with 0, 1, 2, and 3. The associated inverse metric is

This decomposition is quite general, and all terms are dimensionless. Kaluza then applies the machinery of standard general relativity to this metric. The field equations are obtained from five-dimensional Einstein equations, and the equations of motion from the five-dimensional geodesic hypothesis. The resulting field equations provide both the equations of general relativity and of electrodynamics; the equations of motion provide the four-dimensional geodesic equation and the Lorentz force law, and one finds that electric charge is identified with motion in the fifth dimension.

The hypothesis for the metric implies an invariant five-dimensional length element :

Field equations from the Kaluza hypothesis 
The field equations of the 5-dimensional theory were never adequately provided by Kaluza or Klein because they ignored the scalar field. The full Kaluza field equations are generally attributed to Thiry, who obtained vacuum field equations, although Kaluza originally provided a stress–energy tensor for his theory, and Thiry included a stress–energy tensor in his thesis. But as described by Gonner, several independent groups worked on the field equations in the 1940s and earlier. Thiry is perhaps best known only because an English translation was provided by Applequist, Chodos, & Freund in their review book. Applequist et al. also provided an English translation of Kaluza's article. Translations of the three (1946, 1947, 1948) Jordan articles can be found on the ResearchGate and Academia.edu archives. The first correct English-language Kaluza field equations, including the scalar field, were provided by Williams.

To obtain the 5D field equations, the 5D connections  are calculated from the 5D metric , and the 5D Ricci tensor  is calculated from the 5D connections.

The classic results of Thiry and other authors presume the cylinder condition:
 
Without this assumption, the field equations become much more complex, providing many more degrees of freedom that can be identified with various new fields. Paul Wesson and colleagues have pursued relaxation of the cylinder condition to gain extra terms that can be identified with the matter fields, for which Kaluza otherwise inserted a stress–energy tensor by hand.

It has been an objection to the original Kaluza hypothesis to invoke the fifth dimension only to negate its dynamics. But Thiry argued that the interpretation of the Lorentz force law in terms of a 5-dimensional geodesic militates strongly for a fifth dimension irrespective of the cylinder condition. Most authors have therefore employed the cylinder condition in deriving the field equations. Furthermore, vacuum equations are typically assumed for which

 
where
 
and
 
The vacuum field equations obtained in this way by Thiry and Jordan's group are as follows.

 
It shows that the electromagnetic field is a source for the scalar field. Note that the scalar field cannot be set to a constant without constraining the electromagnetic field. The earlier treatments by Kaluza and Klein did not have an adequate description of the scalar field and did not realize the implied constraint on the electromagnetic field by assuming the scalar field to be constant.

 
It has the form of the vacuum Maxwell equations if the scalar field is constant.

The field equation for the 4D Ricci tensor  is obtained from
 
where  is the standard 4D Ricci scalar.

This equation shows the remarkable result, called the "Kaluza miracle", that the precise form for the electromagnetic stress–energy tensor emerges from the 5D vacuum equations as a source in the 4D equations: field from the vacuum. Therefore, the field needs to be rescaled with a conversion constant  such that .

The relation above shows that we must have
 
In the Kaluza theory, the gravitational constant can be understood as an electromagnetic coupling constant in the metric. There is also a stress–energy tensor for the scalar field. The scalar field behaves like a variable gravitational constant, in terms of modulating the coupling of electromagnetic stress–energy to spacetime curvature. It is often assumed that the fifth coordinate is spacelike in its signature in the metric.

In the presence of matter, the 5D vacuum condition can not be assumed. Indeed, Kaluza did not assume it. The full field equations require evaluation of the 5D Einstein tensor
 
as seen in the recovery of the electromagnetic stress–energy tensor above. See Williams for a complete set of 5D curvature tensors under the cylinder condition, evaluated using tensor-algebra software.

Equations of motion from the Kaluza hypothesis 
The equations of motion are obtained from the five-dimensional geodesic hypothesis in terms of a 5-velocity :

This equation can be recast in several ways, and it has been studied in various forms by authors including Kaluza, Pauli, Gross & Perry, Gegenberg & Kunstatter, and Wesson & Ponce de Leon, but it is instructive to convert it back to the usual 4-dimensional length element , which is related to the 5-dimensional length element  as given above:

Then the 5D geodesic equation can be written for the spacetime components of the 4-velocity:

The term quadratic in  provides the 4D geodesic equation plus some electromagnetic terms:

The term linear in  provides the Lorentz force law:

This is another expression of the "Kaluza miracle". The same hypothesis for the 5D metric that provides electromagnetic stress–energy in the Einstein equations, also provides the Lorentz force law in the equation of motions along with the 4D geodesic equation. Yet correspondence with the Lorentz force law requires that we identify the component of 5-velocity along the fifth dimension with electric charge:

Thus, electric charge is understood as motion along the fifth dimension. The fact that the Lorentz force law could be understood as a geodesic in 5 dimensions was to Kaluza a primary motivation for considering the 5-dimensional hypothesis, even in the presence of the aesthetically unpleasing cylinder condition.

If there is no gradient in the scalar field, the term quadratic in  vanishes. But otherwise the expression above implies

For elementary particles, . The term quadratic in  should dominate the equation, perhaps in contradiction to experience. This was the main shortfall of the 5-dimensional theory as Kaluza saw it, and he gives it some discussion in his original article.

Start with the alternate form of the geodesic equation, written for the covariant 5-velocity:

This means that under the cylinder condition,  is a constant of the 5-dimensional motion:

Kaluza's hypothesis for the matter stress–energy tensor 
Kaluza proposed a 5D matter stress tensor  of the form

where  is a density, and the length element  is as defined above.

Then the spacetime component gives a typical "dust" stress–energy tensor:

The mixed component provides a 4-current source for the Maxwell equations:

Just as the five-dimensional metric comprises the 4-D metric framed by the electromagnetic vector potential, the 5-dimensional stress–energy tensor comprises the 4-D stress–energy tensor framed by the vector 4-current.

Quantum interpretation of Klein 
Kaluza's original hypothesis was purely classical and extended discoveries of general relativity. By the time of Klein's contribution, the discoveries of Heisenberg, Schrödinger, and de Broglie were receiving a lot of attention. Klein's Nature article suggested that the fifth dimension is closed and periodic, and that the identification of electric charge with motion in the fifth dimension can be interpreted as standing waves of wavelength , much like the electrons around a nucleus in the Bohr model of the atom. The quantization of electric charge could then be nicely understood in terms of integer multiples of fifth-dimensional momentum.

where  is the Planck constant. Klein found that  cm, and thereby an explanation for the cylinder condition in this small value.

Klein's  article of the same year, gave a more detailed treatment that explicitly invoked the techniques of Schroedinger and de Broglie. It recapitulated much of the classical theory of Kaluza described above, and then departed into Klein's quantum interpretation. Klein solved a Schroedinger-like wave equation using an expansion in terms of fifth-dimensional waves resonating in the closed, compact fifth dimension.

Quantum field theory interpretation

Group theory interpretation 

In 1926, Oskar Klein proposed that the fourth spatial dimension is curled up in a circle of a very small radius, so that a particle moving a short distance along that axis would return to where it began. The distance a particle can travel before reaching its initial position is said to be the size of the dimension. This extra dimension is a compact set, and construction of this compact dimension is referred to as compactification.

In modern geometry, the extra fifth dimension can be understood to be the circle group U(1), as electromagnetism can essentially be formulated as a gauge theory on a fiber bundle, the circle bundle, with gauge group U(1). In Kaluza–Klein theory this group suggests that gauge symmetry is the symmetry of circular compact dimensions.  Once this geometrical interpretation is understood, it is relatively straightforward to replace U(1) by a general Lie group.  Such generalizations are often called Yang–Mills theories. If a distinction is drawn, then it is that Yang–Mills theories occur on a flat spacetime, whereas Kaluza–Klein treats the more general case of curved spacetime. The base space of Kaluza–Klein theory need not be four-dimensional spacetime; it can be any (pseudo-)Riemannian manifold, or even a supersymmetric manifold or orbifold or even a noncommutative space.

The construction can be outlined, roughly, as follows. One starts by considering a principal fiber bundle P with gauge group G over a manifold M. Given a connection on the bundle, and a metric on the base manifold, and a gauge invariant metric on the tangent of each fiber, one can construct a bundle metric defined on the entire bundle. Computing the scalar curvature of this bundle metric, one finds that it is constant on each fiber: this is the "Kaluza miracle". One did not have to explicitly impose a cylinder condition, or to compactify: by assumption, the gauge group is already compact. Next, one takes this scalar curvature as the Lagrangian density, and, from this, constructs the Einstein–Hilbert action for the bundle, as a whole.  The equations of motion, the Euler–Lagrange equations, can be then obtained by considering where the action is stationary with respect to variations of either the metric on the base manifold, or of the gauge connection.  Variations with respect to the base metric gives the Einstein field equations on the base manifold, with the energy–momentum tensor given by the curvature (field strength) of the gauge connection. On the flip side, the action is stationary against variations of the gauge connection precisely when the gauge connection solves the Yang–Mills equations. Thus, by applying a single idea: the principle of least action, to a single quantity: the scalar curvature on the bundle (as a whole), one obtains simultaneously all of the needed field equations, for both the spacetime and the gauge field.

As an approach to the unification of the forces, it is straightforward to apply the Kaluza–Klein theory in an attempt to unify gravity with the strong and electroweak forces by using the symmetry group of the Standard Model, SU(3) × SU(2) × U(1). However, an attempt to convert this interesting geometrical construction into a bona-fide model of reality flounders on a number of issues, including the fact that the fermions must be introduced in an artificial way (in nonsupersymmetric models). Nonetheless, KK remains an important touchstone in theoretical physics and is often embedded in more sophisticated theories. It is studied in its own right as an object of geometric interest in K-theory.

Even in the absence of a completely satisfying theoretical physics framework, the idea of exploring extra, compactified, dimensions is of considerable interest in the experimental physics and astrophysics communities. A variety of predictions, with real experimental consequences, can be made (in the case of large extra dimensions and warped models). For example, on the simplest of principles, one might expect to have standing waves in the extra compactified dimension(s). If a spatial extra dimension is of radius R, the invariant  mass of such  standing waves would be Mn = nh/Rc with n an integer, h being Planck's constant and c the speed of light. This set of possible mass values is often called the Kaluza–Klein tower.  Similarly, in Thermal quantum field theory a compactification of the euclidean time dimension leads to the Matsubara frequencies and thus to a discretized thermal energy spectrum.

However, Klein's approach to a quantum theory is flawed and, for example, leads to a calculated electron mass in the order of magnitude of the Planck mass.

Examples of experimental pursuits include work by the CDF collaboration, which has re-analyzed particle collider data for the signature of effects associated with large extra dimensions/warped models.

Brandenberger and Vafa have speculated that in the early universe, cosmic inflation causes three of the space dimensions to expand to cosmological size while the remaining dimensions of space remained microscopic.

Space–time–matter theory 
One particular variant of Kaluza–Klein theory is space–time–matter theory or induced matter theory, chiefly promulgated by Paul Wesson and other members of the Space–Time–Matter Consortium. In this version of the theory, it is noted that solutions to the equation

may be re-expressed so that in four dimensions, these solutions satisfy Einstein's equations

with the precise form of the Tμν following from the Ricci-flat condition on the five-dimensional space. In other words, the cylinder condition of the previous development is dropped, and the stress–energy now comes from the derivatives of the 5D metric with respect to the fifth coordinate. Because the energy–momentum tensor is normally understood to be due to concentrations of matter in four-dimensional space, the above result is interpreted as saying that four-dimensional matter is induced from geometry in five-dimensional space.

In particular, the soliton solutions of  can be shown to contain the Friedmann–Lemaître–Robertson–Walker metric in both radiation-dominated (early universe) and matter-dominated (later universe) forms.  The general equations can be shown to be sufficiently consistent with classical tests of general relativity to be acceptable on physical principles, while still leaving considerable freedom to also provide interesting cosmological models.

Geometric interpretation 
The Kaluza–Klein theory has a particularly elegant presentation in terms of geometry. In a certain sense, it looks just like ordinary gravity in free space, except that it is phrased in five dimensions instead of four.

Einstein equations 
The equations governing ordinary gravity in free space can be obtained from an action, by applying the variational principle to a certain action. Let M be a (pseudo-)Riemannian manifold, which may be taken as the spacetime of general relativity. If g is the metric on this manifold, one defines the action S(g) as

where R(g) is the scalar curvature, and vol(g) is the volume element. By applying the variational principle to the action

one obtains precisely the Einstein equations for free space:

where Rij is the Ricci tensor.

Maxwell equations 
By contrast, the Maxwell equations describing electromagnetism can be understood to be the Hodge equations of a principal U(1)-bundle or circle bundle  with fiber U(1).  That is, the electromagnetic field  is a harmonic 2-form in the space  of differentiable 2-forms on the manifold . In the absence of charges and currents, the free-field Maxwell equations are

 

where  is the Hodge star operator.

Kaluza–Klein geometry 
To build the Kaluza–Klein theory, one picks an invariant metric on the circle  that is the fiber of the U(1)-bundle of electromagnetism. In this discussion, an invariant metric is simply one that is invariant under rotations of the circle. Suppose that this metric gives the circle a total length . One then considers metrics  on the bundle  that are consistent with both the fiber metric, and the metric on the underlying manifold . The consistency conditions are:

The Kaluza–Klein action for such a metric is given by

The scalar curvature, written in components, then expands to

where  is the pullback of the fiber bundle projection . The connection  on the fiber bundle is related to the electromagnetic field strength as

That there always exists such a connection, even for fiber bundles of arbitrarily complex topology, is a result from homology and specifically, K-theory. Applying Fubini's theorem and integrating on the fiber, one gets

Varying the action with respect to the component , one regains the Maxwell equations. Applying the variational principle to the base metric , one gets the Einstein equations

with the stress–energy tensor being given by

sometimes called the Maxwell stress tensor.

The original theory identifies  with the fiber metric  and allows  to vary from fiber to fiber. In this case, the coupling between gravity and the electromagnetic field is not constant, but has its own dynamical field, the radion.

Generalizations 
In the above, the size of the loop  acts as a coupling constant between the gravitational field and the electromagnetic field.  If the base manifold is four-dimensional, the Kaluza–Klein manifold P is five-dimensional. The fifth dimension is a compact space and is called the compact dimension. The technique of introducing compact dimensions to obtain a higher-dimensional manifold is referred to as compactification. Compactification does not produce group actions on chiral fermions except in very specific cases: the dimension of the total space must be 2 mod 8, and the G-index of the Dirac operator of the compact space must be nonzero.

The above development generalizes in a more-or-less straightforward fashion to general principal G-bundles for some arbitrary Lie group G taking the place of U(1). In such a case, the theory is often referred to as a Yang–Mills theory and is sometimes taken to be synonymous. If the underlying manifold is supersymmetric, the resulting theory is a super-symmetric Yang–Mills theory.

Empirical tests
No experimental or observational signs of extra dimensions have been officially reported. Many theoretical search techniques for detecting Kaluza–Klein resonances have been proposed using the mass couplings of such resonances with the top quark. An analysis of results from the LHC in December 2010 severely constrains theories with large extra dimensions.

The observation of a Higgs-like boson at the LHC establishes a new empirical test which can be applied to the search for Kaluza–Klein resonances and supersymmetric particles.
The loop Feynman diagrams that exist in the Higgs interactions allow any particle with electric charge and mass to run in such a loop. Standard Model particles besides the top quark and W boson do not make big contributions to the cross-section observed in the  decay, but if there are new particles beyond the Standard Model, they could potentially change the ratio of the predicted Standard Model  cross-section to the experimentally observed cross-section. Hence a measurement of any dramatic change to the  cross-section predicted by the Standard Model is crucial in probing the physics beyond it.

An article from July 2018 gives some hope for this theory; in the article they dispute that gravity is leaking into higher dimensions as in brane theory. However, the article does demonstrate that electromagnetism and gravity share the same number of dimensions, and this fact lends support to Kaluza–Klein theory; whether the number of dimensions is really 3 + 1 or in fact 4 + 1 is the subject of further debate.

See also 

 Classical theories of gravitation
 Complex spacetime
 DGP model
 Quantum gravity
 Compactification (physics)
 Randall–Sundrum model
 Matej Pavšič
 String theory
 Supergravity
 Superstring theory
 Non-relativistic gravitational fields

Notes

References 

   https://archive.org/details/sitzungsberichte1921preussi
 
 
  (Includes reprints of the above articles as well as those of other important papers relating to Kaluza–Klein theory.)

Further reading 

 The CDF Collaboration, Search for Extra Dimensions using Missing Energy at CDF, (2004) (A simplified presentation of the search made for extra dimensions at the Collider Detector at Fermilab (CDF) particle physics facility.)
 John M. Pierre,  SUPERSTRINGS! Extra Dimensions, (2003).
 Chris Pope,  Lectures on Kaluza–Klein Theory.
 Edward Witten (2014). "A Note On Einstein, Bergmann, and the Fifth Dimension", 

Theories of gravity
Particle physics
Physical cosmology
String theory
Physics beyond the Standard Model